Tuloso-Midway Independent School District is a public school district in Nueces County, Texas (USA).
Their mascots are warriors, for the males and Cherokees representing females. The school colors are maroon and gold. Tuloso-Midway is part of the 30-4A district and Wade Miller serves as their athletic director since the summer 2017 semester. TMISD Athletics 
Tuloso Midway athletics include: Basketball, Baseball, Softball, Soccer, Track and field, Cross Country, Volleyball, Swimming and Diving, Golf, and Special Olympics

The district serves sections of Corpus Christi as well as high school students from the London Independent School District. It also accepts transfer students.

The school system is on a year-around calendar, meaning they have periodic "intersessions" throughout the school year. School Calendar

In 2009, the school district was rated "academically acceptable" by the Texas Education Agency.

Schools
Tuloso-Midway High School (Grades 9-12)
Head Principal- Ann Bartosh
Tuloso-Midway Middle School (Grades 6-8)
Tuloso-Midway Intermediate School (Grades 4-5)
Tuloso-Midway Primary School (Grades PK-3)

References

External links
 
 Tuloso-Midway ISD (Archive)

School districts in Nueces County, Texas